Ateli is a small town and a municipal committee near Narnaul in Mahendragarh district in the north Indian state of Haryana. 52 villages are in Ateli tehsil.

Geography
Ateli has an average elevation of 299 m (980 feet).

Demographics
 India census, Ateli had a population of 8678. Males constitute 52% of the population and females 48%. Ateli has an average literacy rate of 78%, higher than the national average of 59.5%; with 58% of the males and 42% of females being literate. Thirteen percent of the population is under six years of age.

Transportation

Railways
Ateli railway station lies on the Rewari-Narnaul route. Only slow passenger trains Chetak Express (12982) Delhi sarai rohilla- ajmer (02066) Mumbai Bandra Bi-weekly (22452) Ringas Mela Special (04792) halts here.

Roads
Rewari-Narnaul highway was a state highway, SH 26, and has been made a national highway, NH 11. The highway is being widened to four lanes. The NH connects Rewari to Ateli, Narnaul, Jhunjhunu and Bikaner.
Transportation facility is very very good to Narnaul, Mahendergarh, Kanina, Rewari, Gurgaon & Delhi.

Politics
The current state MLA of Ateli is Sitaram Yadav of BJP.

References

Cities and towns in Mahendragarh district
Villages in Ateli tehsil